Nutria fur, also known as coypu fur, is used in the fashion industry. It comes from the nutria, a South American rodent and cousin of the beaver.

History of the fur
The nutria is a semi-aquatic mammal native to South America. It first became internationally popular as a fur in the 1930s, when it was worn by Hollywood stars such as Greta Garbo. It resembles beaver, with stiff guard hairs and a soft, short undercoat.

It was originally imported to the southern United States – possibly as early as the 19th century, although in larger numbers from the 1950s – to reduce the population of muskrat. Some escaped and found the swamps of Louisiana ideal territory, leading to their common name of swamp rat. With the decline in the fur market in the 1980s, the population mushroomed and threatened the stability of the wetland ecosystem by eating away the plants that hold the swamp together.

Treatment
Typically, nutria is sheared or plucked for the fur trade. It can be dyed a variety of colors. Its middle weight – considerably lighter than beaver – also makes it suitable for linings. More recently, it is used by some furriers without plucking or shearing. In its natural colour it is light to rich brown, the most valuable furs being in the darker shades, but it may also be dyed.

A faux nutria, made of rabbit fur was at one time branded as nutriette.

Rebranding as 'guilt free'
In 2010, both the BBC and The New York Times reported that nutria was being promoted as a socially acceptable way to wear fur, with a fashion show held in Brooklyn sponsored by the Barataria-Terrebonne National Estuary Program, a conservation body working to preserve Louisiana swampland threatened by the nutria.

Designers using nutria
Oscar de la Renta and Michael Kors are among the designers to have incorporated nutria into their designs, with de La Renta using it on hats and trims and Kors using it to line raincoats.

References

Fur
History of fashion
1930s fashion